Henri Gouraud may refer to:

Henri Gouraud (general) (1867–1946), led the French Fourth Army at the end of the First World War
Henri Gouraud (computer scientist) (born 1944), French computer scientist, inventor of Gouraud shading